Vietnam is a rock, post-punk and new wave band from Atlanta, Georgia on Scared Records. Vietnam first appeared at the dawn of a new decade—the 80's, and ushered in a fresh era of music to the Atlanta new wave scene. Embraced by the early 80's cavalcade of Athens bands such as R.E.M., Pylon, Method Actors,  Love Tractor, etc., Vietnam wowed the patrons of the legendary 688 club, 40 Watt club, and the Agora Ballroom. Their first performance was opening for Public Image Ltd. in April 1980, and the next year they played the Noise Fest in New York, appearing on the ZG compilation release of the same name along with Sonic Youth, Glenn Branca, Y Pants and others. They released their first full-length album on Scared Records in 2004, Past Away.

Current members 

Stan Satin: lead vocals, saxophone, percussion
David Dean: drums, backing vocals, moog synthesiser, steel drum, percussion
David Watkins: drums, percussion
Laurie G-Force: bass, backing vocals
Ken Schenck: electric guitar

Previous members 

Drew Davidson: electric guitar
Tim Hunter: bass, drums, synthesizer
Sue Garner: synthesizer, b.vocals, congas, steel drum
Bruce Sehorne: bass
Lee Self: bass, b.vocals
John Stratton: percussion
J.E. Garnett: bass, b.vocals
Paul Lenz: drums
Nicky Gianaris: bass
Dana Downs: electric guitar, b.vocals, percussion
Lenore Thompson: bass, b.vocals
Randy Presley: drums
Bryan Lilje: bass
Jennifer Ericson: electric guitar
John Stun: electric guitar

Discography 
Noise Fest compilation, 1981
Past Away (2004)

References
Article in Creative Loafing
[ AllMusic Guide]

External links
Record Label's website
CD Baby website
payplay download site
Video of Vietnam Live, 2006
Music Video of the song "Teeth," Live, 2006

Musical groups from Georgia (U.S. state)
American new wave musical groups
American post-punk music groups